Hazewind is a smock mill in Gieten, Drenthe, Netherlands. It was built in 1833 and has been restored to working order. The mill is listed as a Rijksmonument, number 16126.

History
In the early nineteenth century, farmers in Gieten had to take their corn to Eext, Gasselte or Annerveen to be ground. In 1805, two builders from Oosterhesselen who had been restoring the church at Gieten proposed that a windmill should be built. Although there were many supporters there were also a lot of objectors to the plan. Among the objectors were Messrs Braams, Hiddingh and Grevelink, millers at Eext, Gasselte and Annerveen respectively. Therefore, the plan to build a windmill at Gieten was put on ice.

In 1832, Bernier Lucas Homan proposed the erection of a windmill at Bonnen, but then decided that it should be built behind his house in Gieten. The mill was completed in 1833. At first, the entrance to the mill was between Homan's house and the Hotel Braams, but the noise from farmers' carts delivering corn early in the morning lead to complaints and a new access to the mill was provided from the Eexterweg.

The mill was worked until 1936. It remained in the Homan family until 1947 when it was sold to E Greving for ƒ4.000. Many visitors to the mill left their graffiti behind. A restoration was undertaken in 1964 when new sails were fitted. The mill was described by Het Nieusblad van het Noorden in 1965 as "one of the oldest corn mills now standing in Drenthe". It was at this time that it gained the name Hazewind. Other names suggested included d'Olle Wiev'n, Mulders Lust, Liefst Altijd Draaien and Hard Gezwoegd.

A problem arose from development in Gieten. As part of the solution, some of the trees were cut down. A further restoration was carried out in 2004, new sails were fitted.

Description

Hazewind is what the Dutch describe as an "achtkante stellingmolen". It is a smock mill with a stage. The mill has a three-storey smock which is thatched, as is the cap. The windshaft also carries the brake wheel which has 65 cogs. This drives the wallower (35 cogs) at the top of the upright shaft. At the bottom of the upright shaft, the great spur wheel, which has 85 cogs, drives two pairs of French Burr millstones via lantern pinion stone nuts with 25 staves each. These millstones are used for grinding wheat. The pearl barley stones are not complete, and the drive for them is missing.

Public access

Hazewind is open to the public on Saturdays.

References

Further reading

Windmills in Drenthe
Smock mills in the Netherlands
Windmills completed in 1833
Grinding mills in the Netherlands
Rijksmonuments in Drenthe
Octagonal buildings in the Netherlands
Aa en Hunze